Betty Crocker is a brand and fictional character used in advertising campaigns for food and recipes.  The character was originally created by the Washburn-Crosby Company in 1921 following a contest in the Saturday Evening Post.  In 1954, General Mills introduced the red spoon logo with her signature, placing it on Gold Medal flour, Bisquick, and cake-mix packages. A portrait of Betty Crocker, first commissioned in 1936 and revised several times since, appears on printed advertisements and product packaging. 

The character was developed in 1920 as a way to give a personalized response to consumer product questions. The name Betty was selected because it was viewed as a cheery, all-American name.  It was paired with the last name Crocker, in honor of William Crocker, a Washburn Crosby Company director. The character's image has been updated seven times since her creation, reflecting changes in fashions and hairstyles.

Described as an American cultural icon, the image of Betty Crocker has endured several generations, adapting to changing social, political and economic currents. Apart from advertising campaigns in printed, broadcast and digital media, she received a number of cultural references in film, literature, music and comics.

Creation

Betty Crocker was created in 1921 by Washburn-Crosby and advertising executive Bruce Barton. Crocker was based on a sous-chef from Franklin College — where Barton attended school — that made the delicious, if somewhat dry, baked goods for the cafeteria. Under Marjorie Husted's supervision, the image of Betty Crocker became the "Zeus" of General Mills. In 1928, Washburn Crosby merged with other milling companies to form General Mills.

In 1924, Crocker acquired a voice with the debut of "The Betty Crocker Cooking School of the Air" on one station in Minneapolis. It was the country's first radio cooking program. Blanche Ingersoll followed by Husted were selected to portray Betty Crocker. The show proved popular, and eventually was carried nationally on NBC Radio, with Agnes White as Betty. Over the next three decades, the women would anonymously portray Betty Crocker on the air and at cooking schools.

In 1929, Betty Crocker coupons were introduced. Inserted in bags of flour, they could be used to reduce the cost of Oneida Limited flatware. By 1932, this scheme had become so popular that General Mills began to offer an entire set of flatware; the pattern was called "Friendship" (later renamed "Medality"). In 1937, the coupons were printed on the outside of packages, copy on which told purchasers to "save and redeem for huge savings on fine kitchen and home accessories in our catalog".

Cookbooks 
From 1930, General Mills issued softbound recipe books, including, in 1933, Betty Crocker's 101 Delicious Bisquick Creations, as Made and Served by Well-Known Gracious Hostesses, Famous Chefs, Distinguished Epicures and Smart Luminaries of Movieland.

The Betty Crocker Cook Book of All-Purpose Baking was published as an aid to wartime considerations in cooking.

In 1950, the Betty Crocker Picture Cookbook was published. It was written by nutritionist Agnes White Tizard.

In 2005, the 10th edition of the Betty Crocker cookbook was published, as well as a Spanish/English bilingual book that collects some of the more common recipes for Spanish-speaking readers looking to cook American-style food. An 11th edition, in ring-binder format, appeared in 2011. At least 17 other Betty Crocker recipe collections were also in print in 2015. Recipes and collections are also available digitally.

Media
Betty Crocker programs first appeared on radio on local stations in 1924. The first network Betty Crocker broadcast was on NBC in 1926. The show remained on network radio until 1953; most of the time the program was on NBC or CBS, but it was on ABC from 1947 to 1953.

Betty Crocker was portrayed by several actresses, including Marjorie Husted on radio for twenty years, and Adelaide Hawley Cumming on television between 1949 and 1964.

In 1949, the actress Adelaide Hawley Cumming became Betty Crocker for many years. She appeared for several years on The George Burns and Gracie Allen Show, and even had her own TV show, Betty Crocker Star Matinee. She also appeared in the CBS network's first color commercial, in which she baked a "mystery fruit cake". Hawley continued to portray Betty Crocker until 1964.

A portrait of Betty Crocker was first commissioned in 1936, a "motherly image" that "blended the features of several Home Service Department members" that was painted by Neysa McMein. It subtly changed over the years, but always accommodated General Mills' cultural perception of the American homemaker — knowledgeable and caring. The 1996 portrait of Betty Crocker, according to General Mills, was partially inspired by a "computerized composite" of "75 women of diverse backgrounds and ages."  These portraits were always painted, with no real person ever having posed as a model.

In 1945, Fortune magazine named Betty Crocker the second most popular woman in America; Eleanor Roosevelt was named first. In the same year, Fortune "outed" Betty Crocker as a fictitious creation, calling her a "fake" and a "fraud."

Legacy

The Minneapolis suburb of Golden Valley, Minnesota, where General Mills is headquartered, has a street named Betty Crocker Drive.

There are a number of Betty Crocker–branded products, including plastic food containers and measuring cups, and a line of small appliances such as popcorn poppers and sandwich makers.

In 2006, the Betty Crocker catalog operation went out of business with all of its inventory on sale. Points were redeemable until December 15, 2006. A new online store was launched in April 2007 but discontinued sometime thereafter.

Products

 Bac-Os (discontinued in 2016)
 Betty Crocker Brownie bar
 Betty Crocker Cookbook
 Betty Crocker baking mixes
 Bisquick
Fruit Roll-Ups
 Betty Crocker canned frosting
 Bowl Appetit shelf-stable entrees
 Betty Crocker Soda Licious (discontinued)
 Cake and dessert decorating products
 Dunk-a-roos
 Fruit by the Foot
 Fruit Gushers
 Hamburger Helper and related products
 Potato Buds instant mashed potatoes
 Suddenly Salad mixes
 "Shake and make" pancake mix
 Warm Delights microwavable desserts

See also
 Betty Bossi
 Betty Crocker Kitchens

Citations

General sources 
 
 Crocker, Betty. Betty Crocker's Picture Cook Book. New York: McGraw-Hill and General Mills, 1950 (first edition of the "Big Red" cookbook).
 Dunning, John. On the Air: The Encyclopedia of Old-Time Radio.  Oxford University Press, 1998. .
 Gray, James. Business without Boundary: The Story of General Mills. Minneapolis: University of Minnesota Press, 1954 (scholarly history of General Mills, including the invention of Crocker).
 Marks, Susan (2007). Finding Betty Crocker: The Secret Life of America's First Lady of Food University of Minnesota Press. . (Popular book.)
 Shapiro, Laura. "Is She Real?" In Something from the Oven: Reinventing Dinner in 1950s America, 169–209. New York: Viking, 2004. (Chapter on Betty Crocker in a popular book with footnotes.)

External links
 

American culture
Baking mixes
Cookbooks
Crocker, Betty
Crocker
Crocker
Crocker, Betty
Crocker, Betty
Food product brands
General Mills brands
Crocker, Betty
Crocker, Betty
Mass media franchises introduced in 1921
Crocker